Octamethylenediamine (OMDA) is an organic chemical compound from the substance group of aliphatic diamines. It is used as a versatile reaction intermediate in the manufacture of pesticides, especially fungicides.

Manufacture 
The industrial production of octamethylene diamine is carried out by the catalytic hydrogenation of suberonitrile at temperatures of 150 to 180 °C and a pressure of 50 to 180 bar in the presence of ammonia over heterogeneous cobalt unsupported catalysts:

The reaction is carried out in the liquid phase and is carried out continuously or batchwise. The catalyst is arranged as a fixed bed in a shaft, tube, or tube bundle reactor.

Characteristics 
Octamethylenediamine is a combustible but difficult to ignite. It is a solid that is easily soluble in water. The aqueous solutions are strongly alkaline (pH value of 12.1 at a concentration of 10 g/L).

Use 
Octamethylenediamine is used as a versatile intermediate in manufacturing pesticides, especially fungicides.

Safety instructions 
While octamethylenediamine is combustible, it is difficult to ignite because it is solid at moderate temperatures. It has a lower explosive limit (LEL) of 1.1 % by volume and an upper explosive limit (UEL) of 6.8 % by volume. The ignition temperature is 280 °C The substance therefore falls into temperature class T3. With a flash point of 113 °C, the liquid is considered difficult to ignite.

References

External links 

 

Corrosive substances
Diamines